The Auloniads (Αὐλωνιάς from the classical Greek αὐλών "valley, ravine") were nymphs who were found in mountain pastures and vales, often in the company of Pan, the god of nature.

Eurydice, for whom Orpheus traveled into dark Hades, was an Auloniad, and it was in the valley of the Thessalian river Pineios where she met her death, indirectly, at the hands of Aristaeus, son of the god Apollo and the nymph Cyrene. It was Aristaeus's wish to ravish Eurydice and either disgust or fear compelled her to run away from him without looking where she was going. Eurydice trod on a venomous serpent and died.

References

Nymphs